Blue Eyed is a 1996 documentary film by Bertram Verhaag in which Jane Elliott is teaching a workshop on racism.

References

External links

Transcript

1996 films
1990s German-language films
German black-and-white films
American documentary films
German documentary films
Documentary films about racism
Social science experiments
1996 documentary films
Eye color
1990s English-language films
1990s American films
1990s German films
English-language documentary films
English-language German films